Namkeen, is a 1982 Hindi-language social drama film, directed by Gulzar, it stars Sanjeev Kumar, Sharmila Tagore, Shabana Azmi, Waheeda Rehman in the lead role. It was yet another film by Gulzar made on some very sensitive but untouched aspects of Indian society especially in rural areas. The story Akal Basant was by Samaresh Basu on whose story, Gulzar had previously made Kitaab (1977).

The film won the National Film Awards in 1983 for Best Audiography for Essabhai M. Suratwala. At the 30th Filmfare Awards, Namkeen won Best Story and Best Art Direction, while Waheeda Rehman and Kiran Vairale both received Best Supporting Actress nominations for their performances in the film.

Plot

Three unmarried sisters live in a remote village in Himachal Pradesh
with their old mother, Jugni (Waheeda Rehman), a former nautanki (folk theatre) dancer, who sells spices and takes in boarders to make a living. The three daughters are named like flavors in food. The 'salty' eldest daughter Nimki (Sharmila Tagore), quietly but firmly holds the household together. The 'sweet' middle sister is Mitthu (Shabana Azmi), an intelligent and romantic girl, unable to speak. The 'tangy' youngest one is Chinki (Kiran Vairale), a bold and vibrant teenager, who turns out to be very perceptive. Their quiet little haven is occasionally threatened by the alcoholic father Kishanlal (Ram Mohan), a sarangi player from the travelling troupe, who keeps trying to reclaim his daughters. Jugni would have left him years ago to protect her daughters from the life of a nautanki dancer which she had always struggled to escape.

The four women live in a very old house outside the village. Gerulal (Sanjeev Kumar) is a truck driver who joins this peculiar household for a brief time as a tenant. Initially stunned by their non-social ways, watching the grit with which they struggle through their difficulties, he is filled with respect for them. Despite the crisis they face in terms of money and facilities, all three sisters maintaining their moral values and dignified behavior. He begins to like Nimki. Mitthu, whom he sympathizes with, develops feelings for Gerulal. When Gerulal needs to move on from that region because of work, he proposes to Nimki. She turns down his proposal citing the responsibility of her sisters and her mother, and suggests he marry Mithu instead. Gerulal is unable to comply with her request.

Three years later, Gerulal is shocked to find Chinki performing at a village nautanki. He learns how drastically things changed after he left the village. Miitthu loses her mental balance and accidentally falls off a cliff and dies. Jugni dies from the shock and Chinki, with not much left to choose from, has joined her father's troupe. Gerulal rushes back to Jugni's crumbling old house to find Nimki, alone and aged beyond her years, looking almost like a reflection of her mother. This time, he takes her away with him.

Themes
The main characters of the movie are Gerulal and Nimki. Gerulal was depicted as a thread who brought together all the sporadic pearls of that family.  Nimki is a person who is always ready to sacrifice and she always puts her interests after her sisters and mother.

Cast
Sanjeev Kumar as Gerulal
Sharmila Tagore as Nimki
Shabana Azmi as Mithu
Waheeda Rehman as Jyoti/Jugni
Kiran Vairale as Chinki

Production
Originally Rekha was cast in the role of Nimki, which was later played by Sharmila Tagore.

Release

Soundtrack

The soundtrack was composed by R. D. Burman and lyrics by Gulzar, and featured songs by playback singers Kishore Kumar and Asha Bhosle.

Awards
30th National Film Awards:
Best Audiography: Essabhai M. Suratwala
30th Filmfare Awards:

Won

 Best Story – Samaresh Basu
 Best Art Direction – Ajit Nanerjee

Nominated

 Best Supporting Actress – Kiran Vairale
 Best Supporting Actress – Waheeda Rehman

References

External links
 

1980s Hindi-language films
Films scored by R. D. Burman
1982 films
Films based on short fiction
Films set in Himachal Pradesh
Films about women in India
Films directed by Gulzar
Films that won the Best Audiography National Film Award
Doordarshan television films
Films based on works by Samaresh Basu